Frank Nicholson may refer to:

 Frank Nicholson (cricketer) (1909–1982), South African cricketer 
 Frank Nicholson (rugby union) (1878–?), rugby union player who represented Australia
 Frank Nicholson (business), former managing director
 Frank Nicholson (baseball) (1889–1972), Major League Baseball pitcher

See also
Francis Nicholson (disambiguation)